is a private university in Toyota, Aichi, Japan. The predecessor of the school, a training school for nurses, was founded in 1941. It was chartered in 1989 as a women's junior college called Japan Red Cross Aichi Junior College of Nursing. In 1997 it became coeducational. In 2004 it became a four-year college, adopting the present name at the same time.

External links
 Official website 

Educational institutions established in 2004
Private universities and colleges in Japan
Universities and colleges in Aichi Prefecture
Nursing schools in Japan
Toyota, Aichi
2004 establishments in Japan